Enzo Wouters (born 21 March 1996) is a Belgian cyclist, who currently rides for UCI Continental team .

Major results

2013
 1st Stage 3 Oberösterreich Juniorenrundfahrt
2014
 1st  Road race, National Junior Road Championships
 1st Stage 3 Tour d'Istrie
 1st Stage 3 Oberösterreich Juniorenrundfahrt
 1st Stage 3 Internationale Niedersachsen-Rundfahrt
 2nd Overall Keizer der Juniores
1st Stages 1 & 2b
 3rd Paris–Roubaix Juniors
2016
 2nd Road race, National Under-23 Road Championships
 2nd Antwerpse Havenpijl
 2nd Memorial Philippe Van Coningsloo
2020
 10th Grote Prijs Jean-Pierre Monseré

References

External links

1996 births
Living people
Belgian male cyclists
Place of birth missing (living people)
Sportspeople from Antwerp Province
21st-century Belgian people